Eagle Beach (or Arend Beach) is a beach and neighbourhood of Oranjestad, Aruba. The neighbourhood is famous for its many low-rise resorts and wide public beach. It is the widest beach of Aruba, and has soft white sand. It has been rated one of the best beaches in the world.

This is not a nude beach. Public nudity is illegal on Aruba. Topless sunbathing is tolerated on beaches in resort areas, however this is not allowed on resort grounds. Topless beaches include The Renaissance Island and De Palm Island. These islands have adult beach areas where topless sunbathing and swimming are allowed.

References

External links

Beaches of Aruba
Oranjestad, Aruba
Populated places in Aruba